Justice Sullivan may refer to:

 Francis W. Sullivan (1894–1967), associate justice of the Maine Supreme Judicial Court
 Frank Sullivan Jr. (born 1950), associate justice of the Indiana Supreme Court
 Isaac N. Sullivan (1848–1938), associate justice of the Idaho Supreme Court
 James Sullivan (governor) (1744–1808), associate justice of the Massachusetts Supreme Judicial Court
 Jeremiah Sullivan (1794–1870), associate justice of the Supreme Court of Indiana
 Jeremiah F. Sullivan (1851–1928), associate justice of the Supreme Court of California
 Jeremy Sullivan ((born 1945), Lord Justice of Appeal of England
 John Joseph Sullivan (judge) (1855-1926), chief justice of the Nebraska Supreme Court
 Mark Sullivan (judge) (1911–2001), associate justice of the Supreme Court of New Jersey
 Matt Sullivan (1857–1937), chief justice of the Supreme Court of California
 Michael D. Sullivan (judge) (1938–2000), justice of the Supreme Court of Mississippi
 Raymond L. Sullivan (1907–1999), associate justice of the Supreme Court of California
 William J. Sullivan (born 1939), chief justice of the Connecticut Supreme Court

See also
Judge Sullivan (disambiguation)